The Marshal of the Court, was a senior official of the royal household of the Kingdom of Serbia and Kingdom of Yugoslavia, The Marshal of the Court was in charge of managing the protocol and the functions of the Court, such the receptions of foreign representatives and organising the king's travels abroad. The position, wielding considerable influence, was honoured upon a high-ranking member of the military or a senior diplomat.

History 
The office of Marshal of the Court was first established in 1904. Boško Čolak-Antić was the first acting Marshal of the Royal Court of Serbia appointed by King Peter I. The position was abolished during the German invasion of 1941, and not reinstated after the end of the war and the establishment of the Socialist Federal Republic of Yugoslavia. The last Marshal of the Court was also Čolak-Antić after he replaced Slavko Grujić. The building of the Marshal of the Court was called . Located in the middle of the Palace Garden, it had a characteristic semicircular base in the shape of a horseshoe; it was demolished in 1957.

List of Marshals of the Court since 1904

References

Citations

Sources 

 
 
 
 
 
 
 

 
Serbian monarchy
Kingdom of Yugoslavia